Sentul City (previously Bukit Sentul) is a modern housing area situated at Sentul, Babakan Madang, Bogor Regency, in West Java, Indonesia. Its geographical coordinates are 6 52' 0" South, 112 26' 0" East and its original name (with diacritics) is Sentul. Located near Bogor, it is about 48 km south of Indonesia's capital city, Jakarta. Sentul City is located at the western foot of the Jonggol Mountains, it is a mountainous township with an area of approximately 3100 hectares.

Infrastructure
 
Sentul International Convention Center is located in the township. It is also the location of a 3.9 km long racing circuit that has been used predominantly for bike racing and the Asian F3 series. The township has hotels, shopping malls, culinary center, children's amusement park, a national drug rehab centre, an eco-tour development, and two golf courses, etc. A cultural park known as Taman Budaya Sentul, which is built with a Sundanese cultural concept. Citra Sentul Raya is also located in this township. 

After recent years of slow growth, recent developments include Aeon shopping mall.The Opus Park  is located in the township consists of three apartment towers.  With an area of 7.8 hectares, it has also a shopping mall and five-star hotels.

Transportation
Sentul is connected to Jakarta and Bogor by Jagorawi toll road. It will also have a station of Greater Jakarta LRT which is now under-construction.

References

External links

Wikimapia.org – Bukit Sentul
Al-Taqwa College Indonesia Sekolah Internasional – Bukit Sentul, Hambalang

Populated places in West Java
Planned townships in Indonesia